Barbershop: The Series is an American sitcom which made its debut on the Showtime cable network in August 2005. It is based upon the Marc Brown–created characters from the popular films Barbershop (2002) and Barbershop 2: Back in Business (2004), and was developed for television by screenwriter John Ridley. It starred Omar Gooding as Calvin Palmer, Jr., the proprietor of an African-American barbershop on the South Side of Chicago, Illinois.

The series was produced by Barbershop and Barbershop 2 producers George Tillman, Jr. and Robert Teitel, along with original Barbershop star Ice Cube.  It lasted for only one season, and ten episodes were aired (seven of which were written by Ridley).

Production
While the original films were no stranger to controversy, the series uses humor to more deeply explore a variety of issues related to the contemporary African-American community, including drug abuse, entrepreneurship, local politics, and the use of the N-word.

Continuing from the events of Barbershop 2, the series makes several minor changes. Isaac's surname is changed from Rosenberg to Brice (and the dark-haired man becomes a blond). The Nigerian-born Dinka is renamed "Yinka", as Yinka is an actual Nigerian name, while Dinka is not.  Additionally, Dinka was naive and slightly overweight, while Yinka is well-educated and muscular. Ricky, the reformed criminal, is replaced by a more hardened ex-con, Jen's distant relative Romadal Dupree. Finally, Isaac and Jimmy (instead of Yinka) each harbor a crush on Terri.

Cast and characters
 Omar Gooding as Calvin Palmer, Jr.  Calvin is the owner of Calvin Jr.’s Barbershop, first opened in 1958 as "Calvin's Barbershop" by his father Calvin Palmer, Sr.  He and his wife Jen have a son, Cody.
The character was first portrayed in the original Barbershop film by Ice Cube.
 Gbenga Akinnagbe as Yinka.  An immigrant from Nigeria, Yinka fled that country to escape local sectarian violence.  He is by far the most well-educated employee at the barbershop.
The character was first portrayed in the original Barbershop film (where he was named Dinka) by Leonard Earl Howze.
 Anna Brown as Jen Palmer.  Jen is a homemaker, and has studied hotel management in community college.  She and her husband Calvin have a son, Cody.
The character was first portrayed in the original Barbershop film by Jazsmin Lewis.
 Wes Chatham as Isaac Brice.  Isaac is a White man raised in African-American neighborhoods, and exclusively dates women of color.  He is particularly attracted to his fellow barber Terri Jones.
The character was first portrayed in the original Barbershop film (where he was named Isaac Rosenberg) by Troy Garity.
 Leslie Elliard as Jimmy James.  A former employee at the barbershop, Jimmy quit to pursue a career in local politics.  Jimmy goes to great lengths to appear more important than is actually the case.  He is politically conservative, and considers Calvin to be his best friend.
The character was first portrayed in the original Barbershop film by Sean Patrick Thomas.
 Barry Shabaka Henley as Eddie Walker.  The oldest employee at the barbershop, Eddie was hired by Calvin Palmer, Sr. on Independence Day 1967.  As explained in Barbershop 2, Eddie prevented the shop from being looted or firebombed during the King-assassination riots in April 1968.  In return, Calvin Sr. decreed that Eddie would never again have to pay rent for his chair.  Eddie often tells tall tales about his past, and frequently complains that the current generation has no values or sense of history.
The character was first portrayed in the original Barbershop film by Cedric the Entertainer.
 Toni Trucks as Terri Jones.  Terri is the only female barber at Calvin Jr.'s.  She is very quick to anger, and her short temper affects almost all of her interpersonal relationships.
The character was first portrayed in the original Barbershop film by Eve.
 Dan White as Romadal Dupree. Romadal is a distant relative of Jen Palmer, who convinced Calvin to hire him.  He is an ex-con who was recently released from prison, and is feared throughout the South Side.  He has no real skills as a barber.
Unlike the other major characters, Romadal originated in this series.

Episodes

References

External links
 

2005 American television series debuts
2005 American television series endings
2000s American black sitcoms
English-language television shows
Showtime (TV network) original programming
Live action television shows based on films
Television shows set in Chicago
Television series by MGM Television
2000s American single-camera sitcoms
Television series created by John Ridley
Cube Vision films
Barbershop (franchise)